Red Russia or Red Russian may refer to:
 Communism in Russia; in particular:
 Bolsheviks, party that seized power in Russia in 1917
 Russian Soviet Federative Socialist Republic (1917–91)
 Winning side in the Russian Civil War (1917–23)
 Soviet Union (1924–91), pars pro toto, the Russian SFSR being the predominant component of the union
 Red Ruthenia, a historical region of eastern Europe now split between Ukraine and Poland
 Red Russian (cocktail), vodka with either cherry liqueur or strawberry schnapps
 Red Russia, a 1907 book by John Foster Fraser
 Red Russia, a 1919 book by John Reed (journalist)
 Red Russia, a 1931 book by Theodor Seibert

See also
 White Russia (disambiguation)
 Soviet Russia (disambiguation)
 Russian Red, Spanish indie and folk singer-songwriter